Totem is the debut album by the Australian black metal band Nazxul. It was released in 1995.

Track listing 

1995 debut albums
Nazxul albums